Marcel Camus (21 April 1912 – 13 January 1982) was a French film director. He is best known for Orfeu Negro (Black Orpheus), which won the Palme d'Or at the 1959 Cannes Film Festival and the 1960 Oscar for Best Foreign Language Film.

Biography
Camus was born in Chappes, Ardennes, France and died in Paris. He studied art and intended to become an art teacher. However, World War II interrupted his plans. He spent part of the war in a German prisoner-of-war camp.    
   
Prior to directing films, Camus assisted filmmakers in France, including Jacques Feyder, Luis Buñuel, and Jacques Becker. He directed nearly a dozen films, including Orfeu Negro (also known as Black Orpheus), which won the Palme d'Or at the 1959 Cannes Film Festival and the 1960 Academy Award for Best Foreign Language Film

In 1960, Camus made a second Brazlilian-themed film, Os bandeirantes. Twenty years after Orfeu Negro, Camus returned to Brazilian themes for what would prove to be his last film, Bahia (also known as Otalia da Bahia and Os pastores da noite), based on a novel by Brazilian novelist Jorge Amado. These films, however, failed to recapture the success of Orfeu Negro. In 1970, Camus had a moderate success with a World War II comedy, Le Mur de l'Atlantique (The Atlantic Wall), starring the well-known French comedian Bourvil.   Camus ended his career working primarily in television.

Camus married one of the stars of Orfeu Negro, Marpessa Dawn.

Camus is buried in Père Lachaise Cemetery.

Filmography 

 Champions Juniors (1951) – writer
 Fugitive in Saigon (1957) – director
 Orfeu Negro (1959) - director
 The Pioneers (1961) - writer and director
 Bird of Paradise (1962) - co-writer and director
 Le Chant du monde (1965) - director
 Love in the Night  (1968) - director
 Atlantic Wall (1970) - director
 (1973, TV miniseries) - director
 Bahia (1978) - writer and director
  (co-director: , 1979, TV miniseries) - director
 Mein Freund Winnetou (1980, TV miniseries) - director

References

External links
 

1912 births
1982 deaths
People from Ardennes (department)
French film directors
Directors of Best Foreign Language Film Academy Award winners
Directors of Palme d'Or winners